Kui Min (闵逵) is a Chinese-born pianist.

Childhood and education
Min was born into a family of Chinese traditional musicians with a Western music background, and studied erhu with his father Zhen Min (闵侦) and violin and piano with his mother Xinshu Cai (蔡心淑).

At the age of nine, Min started his piano lessons with Professor Daxin Zhen at the Sichuan Conservatory of Music. After graduating from the Middle School of the Sichuan Conservatory of Music, he went to North America and earned his Bachelor of Music at the Wilfrid Laurier University in Canada, Master of Music at the University of Notre Dame and Doctor of Musical Arts at the University of Wisconsin–Madison in the United States.

Awards
Min is a recipient of many awards and honors, including the first prize in the Kiwanis Music Competition, the first prize in the First China International Piano Competition Southwest Division, Outstanding Performance Certificate in the Dorothy A. Anderson International Piano Competition, the winner of Concerto Competitions at the Wilfrid Laurier University and the University of Notre Dame, and recently the winner of Beethoven Competition at the University of Wisconsin–Madison School of Music. Min has studied piano with Christopher Taylor, John Blacklow, James Parker, Samuel Howard, Gary Amano, and Maria Stäblein; and piano pedagogy with Jessica Johnson.

References

External links
 Official website

Chinese pianists
University of Notre Dame alumni
University of Wisconsin–Madison College of Letters and Science alumni
Living people
Year of birth missing (living people)
21st-century pianists